African American cinema is loosely classified as films made by, for, or about Black Americans. They are an example of Black film. Historically, African American films have  been made with African-American casts and marketed to African-American audiences. The production team and director were sometimes also African American. More recently, Black films featuring multicultural casts aimed at multicultural audiences have also included American Blackness as an essential aspect of the storyline.

Segregation, discrimination, issues of representation, derogatory stereotypes and tired tropes have dogged Black American cinema from the start of a century-plus history that roughly coincided with the century-plus history of American cinema. From the very earliest days of moving pictures, major studios used Black actors to appeal to Black audiences while also often relegating them to bit parts, casting women as maids or nannies, and men as natives or servants or either gender as a "magical negro," an update on the "noble savage."

Black filmmakers, producers, critics and others have resisted narrow archetypes and offensive representation in many ways. As early as 1909, Lester A. Walton the arts critic for New York Age was making sophisticated arguments against the objectification of Black bodies onscreen, pointing out that "anti-Negro propaganda strikes at the very roots of the fundamental principles of democracy." Noting the educational impact film could have, he also argued that it could be used to "emancipate the white American from his peculiar ideas," which were "hurtful to both races."

The "race films" of 1915 to the mid-1950s followed a similar spirit of "racial uplift" and educational "counter-programing" with an eye to combating the racism of the Jim Crow south. That sensibility shifted markedly in the 1960s and '70s. Although Blaxploitation films  continued to include stereotypical characters, they were also praised for portraying Black people as the heroes and subjects of their own stories.

By the 1980s, auteurs like Spike Lee and John Singleton created nuanced depictions of Black lives, which led the way for later filmmakers like Jordan Peele and Ava DuVernay to use a range of genres (horror, history, documentary, fantasy) to explore Black lives from multiple perspectives. Ryan Coogler's 2018 blockbuster superhero film Black Panther has also been widely praised for creating a fully realized Afrocentric urban utopia of Black people that include a foundation myth, a legendary hero and takes "utter delight in its African-ness."

History 
The short film Something Good – Negro Kiss was made in 1898. Early commercial films often depicted minstrel shows until vaudeville acts overtook them in popularity. An African American appeared in narrative film at least as early as 1909, which is also the year that Siegmund Lubin produced the comedy series, using a Black cast, with the derogatory title Sambo. Before then, film roles for Black actors were played by white actors in blackface. Sam Lucas became the first Black actor to be cast in a leading role in a mainstream film, appearing in the 1914 film Uncle Tom's Cabin. The Peter P. Jones Film Company was  established in Chicago and filmed vaudeville acts as well as the 1915 National Half Century Exposition and Lincoln Jubilee.

William D. Foster's The Foster Photoplay Company in Chicago was one of the earliest studios to feature African Americans. Casts for its films included performers from stage shows at Robert T. Motts' Pekin Theatre. Theatre companies the Lafayette Players and The Ethiopian Art Theatre also had several players who crossed over into filmmaking. REOL Productions was a New York City studio that produced films in the early 1920s with actors from the Lafayette Players. During its relatively short existence REOL produced a couple of documentaries, comedies, and a feature film.

Lincoln Motion Picture Company was established in Omaha, Nebraska before relocating to Los Angeles, and was among the very first Black producers of African-American film. Their mission statement was to "encourage black pride"with its "mostly family-oriented pictures." The short-lived white-owned Ebony Film Corporation's was founded in 1915, but the white ownership's poor judgement about its stereotype-laden films aimed at both white and Black audiences led to a public outcry from Black audiences in the wake of divisive anger about The Birth of a Nation. The company shut its doors in 1919, as a result. Norman Studios, founded in 1920 in Jacksonville, Florida, produced drama films with African American casts, even though Norman, himself, was white. Between 1920 to 1928, however, he made a string of successful films, starring Black actors.

Biograph made a series of comedy shorts with comedian Bert Williams.

Documentary shorts (1909–1913) 
Some of the earliest African American films were later classified by scholars as "Uplift Cinema", referencing writer-educator Booker T. Washington's influential uplift movement, which took shape at Tuskegee Institute, an early Post Civil War teacher-training college in Alabama for newly freed slaves. Under his leadership, the college produced several documentary shorts, as a way to promote the institute and build support among the school's benefactors. Their first promotional documentary was 1909's A Trip to Tuskegee (1909) followed in 1913 by A Day at Tuskegee.  That same year, Samuel Chapman Armstrong's Post Civil War Hampton Institute, which focused on "manual labor and self-help," took a page from Washington's book and created its own narrative documentary John Henry at Hampton: A Kind of Student Who Makes Good, specifically to appeal to Northern donors.

Race film (1915–1950s) 

Beginning in 1915, and continuing on until the 1950s, African-American production companies partnered with independent film companies to create "race films," a term that describes movies with African-American casts targeted at poor, and primarily Southern, African-American audiences by African-American producers working on much tighter budgets than their Hollywood rivals.

Race films typically emphasized self-improvement and middle-class values, while also "foster[ing] an entire generation of independent African American filmmakers and helped establish a 'Black cinema' in America, an artform and system where Black directors were empowered to be independent — raising money, shooting and editing, and scoring films themselves." Nearly 500 were made in the United States between 1915 and 1952, and most were shown in the southeastern United States where there were more theaters serving African Americans.

Early stars of the genre included future Oscar winner Hattie McDaniel and the actor, singer and political activist Paul Robeson, who would later be blacklisted during the McCarthy era. Novelist Oscar Micheaux adapted one of his novels for his first film The Homesteader, in 1919, which is credited as one of the earliest race films. Micheaux's second film Within Our Gates, released in 1920, was like all race films, a response to racism, and in this case the racism in D. W. Griffith's divisive 1915 film The Birth of a Nation. Micheaux would go on to write, produce and direct "forty-four feature-length films between 1919 and 1948," leading the Producers Guild of America to call him "The most prolific black — if not most prolific independent — filmmaker in American cinema."

Talkies and musicals (1920s–1940s) 
Early filmmakers sometimes served in multiple roles as actor, director and producer. Spencer Williams, who later starred in Amos 'n' Andy, wrote and directed films. His Amegro Films produced the 1941 film The Blood of Jesus. Novelist-turned-filmmaker Oscar Micheaux who worked in silent film, and later became a prominent director and producer in talkies. William D. Alexander, known for his government-sponsored newsreels aimed at African American audiences early in his career, also became an influential African-American filmmaker.

Major distributors included Toddy Pictures Corporation, which acquired and re-released earlier films under new titles and advertising campaigns and, briefly, Million Dollar Productions, which featured a partnership with African American star Ralph Cooper.

Musical films captured various African-American acts and performers on film. Known as soundies, they were a precursor to music videos, which were often cut from them and then released between the years 1940 and 1946. They featured an enormous range of musical styles and "cheesecake" performances, as well as musicians both white and Black, including singer, dancer and actress Dorothy Dandridge, who would later become the first Black Oscar nominee. Comic actor Stepin Fetchit who was the first Black actor to earn a million dollars, and is controversial for his demeaning portrayal of Black subservience, also appeared in them. Jazz trumpeter Louis Armstrong, who went on to make 20 feature films between the 1930s and 1960s, made soundies too.

Other Black actors famous for their song-and-dance chops include tap dancer, singer and actor Bill "Bojangles" Robinson, who also performed in Shirley Temple films. Singer, dancer and actor Lena Horne, often recognized for her rendition of Stormy Weather in the 1943 musical of the same name, was also the first Black actress signed to a studio contract. Among the most prominent early actress was Oscar winner Hattie McDaniel who won Best Supporting Actress for her role in the 1939 film Gone with the Wind.

Civil Rights era

First movie star (1950s–1970s) 
In the 1950s and 60s, Sidney Poitier became the first Black movie star and the first Black male actor to win the Oscar in a competitive race for Lilies of the Field (1963), one of many acclaimed films in long filmography that includes an Oscar nod for The Defiant Ones (1958), which emphasized racial harmony as a means to an end, In the Heat of the Night (1967), a crime drama that focused on the uneasy partnership that develops between a bigoted white Southern police chief (played by Rod Steiger) whom Poitier famously slaps, and Guess Who's Coming to Dinner? (1967) a box office hit, co-starring Spencer Tracy and Katharine Hepburn as the liberal parents of Poitier's white fiancée, uneasy about their engagement. In the early 1970s, Poitier turned to directing, only to later return to the screen to portray Thurgood Marshall in Separate but Equal (1991) and Nelson Mandela in Mandela and de Klerk (1997). In 2009, Poitier was awarded the U.S. Presidential Medal of Freedom.

Blaxploitation (1971–1979) 

Blaxploitation films are a subset of exploitation films, a term derived from the film marketing term emphasizing the promotion of a brand-name star, a trending topic or titilliating subject matter — in short, a nearly surefire draw at the box office. Both exploitation and blaxploitation films, which are sometimes also called "grindhouse," "cult" or "trash" films are low-budget B-movies, designed to turn a profit.

The 1970s Black variant sought to tell Black stories with Black actors to Black audiences, but they were usually not produced by African Americans. As Junius Griffin, the president of the Hollywood branch of the NAACP, wrote in a New York Times op-ed in 1972: "At present, Black movies are a 'rip off' enriching major white film producers and a very few black people."

Also considered exploitative because of the many stereotypes they relied on, Blaxploitation films typically took place in stereotypically urban environments, African-American characters were frequently charged with overcoming "The Man," which is to say white oppressors, and violence and sex often featured prominently. Despite these tropes, Blaxploitation film was also recognized for portraying Black people as the heroes and subjects of their own stories, and for being the first genre of film to feature funk and soul music on their soundtracks.

Two films, both released in 1971, are said to have invented the genre: Melvin Van Peebles' Sweet Sweetback's Baadasssss Song, about a poor Black man fleeing the white police, and featuring a soundtrack by Earth, Wind & Fire was one. Director Gordon Parks' criminal action movie Shaft, featured a theme song that later won for the Academy Award for Best Original Song for the movie's theme song, which later appeared on multiple Top 100 lists, including AFI's 100 Years...100 Songs was the other.

Other notable films in the genre include Ivan Dixon's first feature film the 1972 thriller Trouble Man, which featured a soundtrack by Marvin Gaye; and Bill Gunn's 1973 experimental horror film Ganja & Hess, later remade by Spike Lee in 2014 as Da Sweet Blood of Jesus.

If Van Peebles and Parks' films made the genre's quintessential films, then Pam Grier was the genre's quintessential actress. Later described by director Quentin Tarantino as cinema's first female action star, Grier was "part of a small group of women who defined the genre", going from bit parts in films such as the satirical melodrama Beyond the Valley of the Dolls to featured roles in movies such as 1973's horror film Scream Blacula Scream and 1973's Coffy, in which she played a vengeful nurse.

L.A. Rebellion (1960s–1980s) 

The L.A. Rebellion film movement, also known as the "Los Angeles School of Black Filmmakers", or the UCLA Rebellion, refers to several dozen young African and African-American filmmakers who studied at UCLA Film School for the 20-year span between the late 1960s to the late 1980s, who went on to create independent Black art house film to provides an alternative to classical Hollywood cinema.

Typically featuring working-class protagonists from communities in need, films such as Charles Burnett's 1978 feature Killer of Sheep have been hailed as a landmark, though until recently many have been hard to find. Julie Dash's 1991 Daughters of the Dust, on the other hand, was the first full-length feature directed by a Black woman that was distributed nation-wide.

Both films are informed by the greater context of the L.A. Rebellion's early days: Adamantly anti-Hollywood, and committed to storytelling based on authentic experience, the L.A. Rebellion was formed soon after the 1965 Watts riots, unrest after a 1969 shoot-out on the UCLA campus, anti-Vietnam and Black Power Movement struggles, which led several students to persuade the university to "launch an ethnographic studies programme responsive to local communities of colour.... The films that followed ... were forged in solidarity with anti-colonial movements from around the world, such as Brazil's Cinema Novo and the Argentinian Grupo Cine Liberación."

Although most films like Burnett's were never widely seen, a resurgence of interest in the radical filmmaking movement led to a 2011 retrospective at the UCLA Hammar Museum, a 2015 retrospective at the Tate Modern, and a 2015 book published by UCLA called L.A. Rebellion: Creating a New Black Cinema.

Contemporary

Cult classics (1980s) 

In between the music and the drama, 1980s film was frequently comic, launching Eddie Murphy's blockbuster film career. In 1987, actor, comedian, and director Robert Townsend's 1987 film Hollywood Shuffle, satirized the Hollywood film industry and its treatment of African Americans and created a buzz. In 1982, Eddie Murphy made the buddy comedy 48 Hrs, which The New York Times called "positively witty". In 1983, he made another hit in Trading Places with Dan Aykroyd.

In 1984, already a proven box-office draw, Murphy left Saturday Night Live, and launched a successful full-time career, with his first solo leading role in Beverly Hills Cop, which went on to have two sequels. In 1988, he made the silly romantic comedy Coming to America (which led to the less well-received sequel Coming 2 America in 2021), and in 1989 he made the comedy-drama crime film Harlem Nights, starring as part of a multi-generational comedy team that included legendary stand-ups Richard Pryor and Redd Foxx.

In 1984, Prince's rock musical drama Purple Rain, which featured an Oscar-winning soundtrack, as well as an album by the same name launched him as a superstar. In full-time filmmaking 1986 black-and-white comedy drama She's Gotta Have It launched Spike Lee into a three-decade plus career and counting. More than 20 years later, his first film was relaunched and reimagined as a two-season 2016 TV series by the same name. Lee ended the decade with 1989's Do the Right Thing, whose story exploring racial tension and simmering violence earned him both critical and commercial accolades, and may still be his most famous film.

First Black matinee idol (1980s-2000s) 

The late 1980s also marked the rise of actor Denzel Washington. He portrayed political activist Steve Biko in the 1987 film Cry Freedom, the title role In Spike Lee's 1992 Malcolm X and several other iconic figures. His won Best Supporting Actor for playing doomed Union Army soldier in the historical drama Glory (1989). Washington would go on to win 17 NAACP Image Awards, three Golden Globes, on Tony Award and a second Academy Award in 2001 for playing the corrupt detective in Antoine Fuqua's thriller Training Day.

In 2020, The New York Times ranked him as the greatest actor of the twenty-first century. In 2002, Washington made his directorial debut with the biographical film Antwone Fisher. His second directorial effort was The Great Debaters (2007). His third film, Fences (2016), in which he also starred, was nominated for the Academy Award for Best Picture.

Breakthrough years (1990s) 
The Guardian newspaper's Steve Rose noted in 2016 that "The late 80s and 90s [also] heralded a breakthrough led by Spike Lee's Do the Right Thing and John Singleton's Boyz N the Hood." IndieWire calls the 1990s, in particular, "a period that witnessed a historic number of films made by African American directors who forever altered what we thought of as "black aesthetics" and who created touchstone works that continue to inspire contemporary filmmakers," crediting John Singleton's Boyz N the Hood (1991), which explores the challenges of ghetto life, Julie Dash's Daughters of the Dust about three generations of Gullah (1991), Kasi Lemmons' Eve's Bayou about the repercussions of a parent's affair and Cheryl Dunye's romantic dramedy Watermelon Woman (1996) as groundbreakers for their ambition and diversity of genre and style. Many also praise Spike Lee's Malcolm X (1992) as the biopic of the decade for its complexity and its frank politics, which began the film with a videotape of the brutal police beating of Rodney King, which sparked off the 1992 Los Angeles riots.

Auteurs and Oscars (2000s–present) 
Spike Lee has built a body of work that predominantly uses Black casts, and tends to explore socio-political themes that range from women's sexual liberation in She's Gotta Have It (1986) to hate groups in the Oscar-winning Black Kkklansman (2018) more than 20 years later. Where Lee is squarely political, other contemporary filmmakers nowadays rely on political subtext hidden in plain sight. Jordan Peele's blockbuster horror film Get Out (2017) was also interpreted as a parable of Black dystopia, and Ryan Coogler's blockbuster Black Panther (2018) was interpreted as a model of Black utopia.

African-American women and African-American gay and lesbian women have also made advances directing films, in Radha Blank's comic The 40-Year-Old Version (2020), Ava DuVernay's fanciful rendition of the children's classic A Wrinkle in Time or Angela Robinson's short film D.E.B.S. (2003) turned feature-length adaptation in 2004.

Director Tim Story is best known for comedies such as Barbershop (2002), the superhero film Fantastic Four (2005) and Ride Along, a buddy comedy franchise. He has been nominated for two NAACP Image Awards for Outstanding Directing in a Feature Film/Television Movie in 2006 and 2013.

Hollywood South 
In the early 2000s, prolific Black filmmaker Tyler Perry began making movies. The films are often loathed by critics, and beloved by audiences. They mostly target Black audiences with slapstick farces that have earned him a loyal following and helped him build his  Atlanta-based movie studio. Forbes describes Tyler Perry in a headline that says: "From 'Poor as Hell' to Billionaire: How Tyler Perry Changed Show Business Forever." "In 2007, the film industry spent $93 million on productions in Georgia. In 2016, it spent over $2 billion." He was awarded the Jean Hersholt Humanitarian Award at the 2021 Oscars ceremony, recognizing him as an "individual in the motion picture industry whose humanitarian efforts have brought credit to the industry," both for his personal generosity and his ingenuity, which extended to creating a "Camp Quarantine" to keep industry regulars employed during the Pandemic.

Controversies and criticism 
Awards shows and membership in film associations have been criticized for largely excluding people of color, as have several recent films. Cultural critic Wesley Morris described The Help (2011) as "an owner's manual," noting that "[t]he best film roles three Black women will have all year require one of them to clean Ron Howard's daughter's house. Earlier films like The Green Mile (1999) and The Legend of Bagger Vance (2000), where a Black character's sole function was to help white people, were similarly criticized.

Gallery of pioneers 
(Selection was limited by availability.)

Gallery of Oscar winners 
(Selection was limited by availability.)

Theorists, critics and historians

Film critics 

 Tony Langston at the Chicago Defender (1920s era)
 Sylvester Russell at the Indianapolis Freeman (192os era)
 D. Ireland Thomas (1875–1955)
 Lester A. Walton (1882–1965) at The New York Age)

 Academics and authors 

 Donald Bogle (1944–present)
 Thomas Cripps (1932–2018)
 Phyllis R. Klotman (1924–2015)
 Audrey Thomas McCluskey (1940s?–present)

 Archives and collections 
In the 1980s, G. William Jones led a restoration of early African American films, and Southern Methodist University has a collection named for him. Kino Lorber produced the Pioneers of African-American Cinema (2015)'' box set. Other notable collections include:

 Black Film Archive: Black films from 1915 to 1979
 The Library of Congress has African American films in its collection, and some coverage of the films.
 The Lucas Museum has acquired a collection of Black Films.
 Pioneers of African-American Cinema (2015)
 The National Museum of African American History and Culture has film posters, lobby cards, and photographs in its collection.
 WUA University has an international collection with a lot of material from American films.

External links 

 African American Home Movie Archive
 African American Film Critics Association (AAFCA)
 Black Film Center/Archive, Indiana University, Bloomington
 The Black Film Critics Circle
 UCLA Film and Television Archive: African American Film and Television

See also 

 Black women film pioneers
 Black women filmmakers
Cinema of the United States
List of African-American documentary films
African American neighborhood
List of Black films of the 2010s
Hood film
List of films about Black girlhood
Pioneers of African-American Cinema (2015)

Bibliography

References

External links

Blaxpoitation 

 Museum of Uncut Funk for more information on the Blaxpoitation movement

Overview 

 Buzzfeed's 70 Classic Black Films Everyone Should See
The Guardian on why Black films matter
The New Republic on Black Cinema Matters
 The New York Times 28 Great Films for Black History Month
Rotten Tomatoes on The 115 Best Black Movies of the 21st Century

Posters and still images 

 Separate Cinema: 100 Years of Black Poster Art and HuffPost's excerpts from the book
 Still images tracing the history of film at Stacker's The History of Black Representation on Film

Race Films 
 Early African American Film: Reconstructing the History of Silent Race Films, 1909–1930: A database on early African-American silent race films.
Rotten Tomatoes on "Race Films: The Black Film Industry that Told Black Stories In Cinema's Earliest Days"
Internet Archive version of William D. Alexander's 1949 race film Souls of Sin

Black women pioneers 
A website for Sisters in Cinema Documentary: A History of African American Women Feature Film Directors

Columbia University on Women Film Pioneer Project: African-American Women in the Silent Film Industry
The Atlantic on When Hollywood's Power Players Were Women
Greenlight Women on Celebrating Black Female Directors and Actresses over 40

African-American cultural history

History of film of the United States